The 2019 German Darts Championship was the second of thirteen PDC European Tour events on the 2019 PDC Pro Tour. The tournament took place at Halle 39, Hildesheim, Germany, from 29–31 March 2019. It featured a field of 48 players and £140,000 in prize money, with £25,000 going to the winner.

Michael van Gerwen was the defending champion after defeating James Wilson 8–6 in the final of the 2018 tournament, but he was defeated 6–4 in the second round by Keegan Brown.

Daryl Gurney won his first European Tour title, by defeating Ricky Evans 8–6 in the final.

James Wade hit the second nine-dart finish of the 2019 European Tour season in his third round defeat to Darren Webster.

Prize money
This is how the prize money is divided:

 Seeded players who lose in the second round do not receive this prize money on any Orders of Merit.

Qualification and format
The top 16 entrants from the PDC ProTour Order of Merit on 12 February will automatically qualify for the event and will be seeded in the second round.

The remaining 32 places will go to players from six qualifying events – 18 from the UK Tour Card Holder Qualifier (held on 22 February), six from the European Tour Card Holder Qualifier (held on 22 February), two from the West & South European Associate Member Qualifier (held on 28 March), four from the Host Nation Qualifier (held on 28 March), one from the Nordic & Baltic Qualifier (held on 5 October 2018) and one from the East European Associate Member Qualifier (held on 19 January).

From 2019, the Host Nation, Nordic & Baltic and East European Qualifiers will only be available to non-tour card holders. Any tour card holders from the applicable regions will have to play the main European Qualifier. The only exceptions being that the Nordic & Baltic qualifiers for the first 3 European Tour events took place in late 2018, before the new ruling was announced.

Michael Smith, who was set to be the 8th seed, withdrew prior to the tournament draw. All seeds below him moved up a place, with James Wilson becoming sixteenth seed, and an extra place being made available in the host nation qualifier.

The following players will take part in the tournament:

Top 16
  Michael van Gerwen (second round)
  Ian White (third round)
  Peter Wright (quarter-finals)
  James Wade (third round)
  Mensur Suljović (second round)
  Adrian Lewis (semi-finals)
  Rob Cross (third round)
  Gerwyn Price (quarter-finals)
  Jonny Clayton (third round)
  Daryl Gurney (champion)
  Joe Cullen (third round)
  Dave Chisnall (second round)
  Darren Webster (quarter-finals)
  Jermaine Wattimena (third round)
  Stephen Bunting (quarter-finals)
  James Wilson (third round)

UK Qualifier
  Mervyn King (third round)
  Martin Atkins (Leeds) (first round)
  Ricky Evans (runner-up)
  Steve Beaton (first round)
  Dave Prins (first round)
  Luke Humphries (second round)
  Andrew Gilding (second round)
  Jamie Hughes (second round)
  Josh Payne (first round)
  Mickey Mansell (first round)
  Mark Dudbridge (second round)
  Scott Taylor (first round)
  Simon Stevenson (second round)
  Nathan Aspinall (second round)
  Andy Boulton (second round)
  Robert Thornton (first round)
  Keegan Brown (semi-finals)

European Qualifier
  Tytus Kanik (first round)
  Mario Robbe (second round)
  Dimitri Van den Bergh (second round)
  Ron Meulenkamp (second round)
  Gabriel Clemens (first round)
  Madars Razma (first round)

West/South European Qualifier
  Diogo Portela (first round)
  Mike De Decker (first round)

Host Nation Qualifier
  Kevin Knopf (second round)
  Mike Holz (first round)
  Maik Langendorf (first round)
  Steffen Siepmann (second round)
  Jyhan Artut (first round)

Nordic & Baltic Qualifier
  Kim Viljanen (first round)

East European Qualifier
  Boris Koltsov (second round)

Draw

References 

2019 PDC Pro Tour
2019 PDC European Tour
2019 in German sport
March 2019 sports events in Germany